John Paul Walker, or JP (born October 16, 1976), nicknamed "The Don", is a professional snowboarder from Salt Lake City, Utah. In the late 1990s he was instrumental in reviving the jib movement.

Walker has been recognized with various awards including Snowboarder magazine's Rider of the Year list six times (more than any other rider in history), European magazine Onboard's Jibber of All Time, and his peers voted him for multiple awards in Transworld Snowboarding magazine’s Rider’s Poll.

Over the course of his career, Walker has produced 17 video parts in many of snowboarding's highest-grossing films. In 2009, he filmed a 100% switch part (riding the opposite way that he naturally does) for This Video Sucks, an accomplishment nobody before him had achieved. Most recently Walker filmed a segment in the movie Good Look from the production company People.

Walker has appeared in magazines from around the globe. His exposure includes both mainstream publications like, Men's Fitness and Complex and action sports magazines like Snowboarder and Transworld Surf. Walker guest-edited the February 2010 issue of Snowboarder alongside long-time friend and pro rider, Jeremy Jones.

Walker's ultimate goal is to continue to push the progression of snowboarding to unexpected heights, primarily through his passion and dedication to the sport.

Sponsors 
Thirtytwo/Etnies, Santa Cruze Snowboards, Nixon, Oakley, Dakine, Bear Mountain, Milosport, Vertra Suncare, dbot 5 and Raw Rev

Achievements 
 Voted Jibber of the Year in Snowboarder magazine’s Top 10 three years in a row
 Named one of Snowboarder’s Top 10 Riders six times
 Awarded multiple times in Transworld Snowboarding’s Rider’s Poll: SIA Retailer’s Choice, Best Rail Rider, Best Freestyle Rider, Best Video Part
 Listed as one of Snowboarder magazine’s Top 20 Most Influential Riders
 Onboard magazine’s Jibber of All Time
 Recipient of Method magazine's "Eternal Radness" Award
 Numerous signature products with sponsoring brands
 Countless never before done tricks like switch frontside 450 to boardslide and frontside double cork

Media appearances 
 Made an appearance on NBC's Today Show because he was the chosen hero of the son of a victim of 9/11
 Gatefold cover of Future Snowboarding magazine (January 2008)
 Cover of Snowboard magazine (February 2008)
 Profiled in Men’s Fitness (March 2008)
 Cover and 8 page interview in Transworld Snowboarding magazine (November 2008)
 Appeared on Fuel TV’s The Daily Habit (September 2009)
 Filmed 100% switch part in This Video Sucks (September 2009)
 Featured in ESPN Rise (September 2009)

Videography 
 Mainstream/1994
 Something Goin' On/1995
 Forward Into Battle/1995
 Warriors/Kingpin Productions/1995
 Gas Money/1996
 Kingpin Chronicles/Kingpin Productions/1996
 Simple Pleasures/MDP/1997
 Decade/MDP/1998
 Technical Difficulties/MDP/1999
 The Resistance/MDP/2000
 True Life/MDP/2001
 Nixon Jib Fest/MDP/2002
 Shakedown/MDP/2003
 Chulksmack/MDP/2004
 That/Forum/2006
 Double Decade/MDP/2008
 This Video Sucks/Stepchild/2009
 Cheers/People/2010
 Good Look/People/2011
 Jibberish Vol.1
 Jibberish Vol.2
 2032/The ThirtyTwo Movie/2015

References 

1976 births
American male snowboarders
Living people